Clara Döhring (13 March 1899 – 7 June 1987) was a German politician of the Social Democratic Party (SPD) and former member of the German Bundestag.

Life 
Clara Döhring had been a member of the SPD since 1917. After the Second World War, she was involved in rebuilding social democracy in Wuerttemberg. Döhring was a member of the German Bundestag from 1949 to 1965. She was elected in the first legislative period in the constituency of Stuttgart I and later via the state list in Baden-Württemberg.

Literature

References

1899 births
1987 deaths
Members of the Bundestag for Baden-Württemberg
Members of the Bundestag 1961–1965
Members of the Bundestag 1957–1961
Members of the Bundestag 1953–1957
Members of the Bundestag 1949–1953
Female members of the Bundestag
20th-century German women politicians
Members of the Bundestag for the Social Democratic Party of Germany